Halina Bronisława Olendzka (born 31 August 1945 in Święta Katarzyna) is a Polish politician. She was elected to the Sejm on 25 September 2005, getting 5386 votes in 33 Kielce district as a candidate from the Law and Justice list.

See also
Members of Polish Sejm 2005-2007

External links
Halina Olendzka - parliamentary page - includes declarations of interest, voting record, and transcripts of speeches.

1945 births
Living people
People from Kielce County
Members of the Polish Sejm 2005–2007
Women members of the Sejm of the Republic of Poland
Law and Justice politicians
21st-century Polish women politicians
Members of the Polish Sejm 2011–2015